What Is This? is a 2019 limited-edition fundraiser album by American experimental rock band Swans. The album was released in March 2019 on band leader Michael Gira's Young God Records. Limited to 2,500 copies, the album served as a fundraiser for the fifteenth Swans album, Leaving Meaning, which was released in October 2019.

Background
The album includes demos that were worked on with a full band for the following Swans record, Leaving Meaning. Songs include reworkings of previous Swans and Gira songs, such as "Amnesia", "Annaline" and "The Knot" (itself a reworking of "No Words / No Thoughts"). Unlike Swans' previous fundraiser albums (with the exception of Gira's I Am Not Insane), What Is This? exclusively contains acoustic demo tracks.

Songs not recorded or left off the release include "You Will Pay" (also known as "You Must Pay"), a rearranged version of 1989's "God Damn the Sun", an untitled "organ thing" and an untitled "long song".

Track listing

Personnel
Michael Gira – guitar, vocals, artwork
Jennifer Gira – vocals on "The Nub"
Nicole Boitos – artwork
Doug Henderson – mastering
Kevin McMahon – recording

References

External links
What Is This? on Young God Records

Crowdfunded albums
Albums produced by Michael Gira
2019 albums
Young God Records albums
Demo albums